Juyom County is in Fars province, Iran. The capital of the county is the city of Juyom. At the 2006 census, the region's population (as Juyom District of Larestan County) was 19,601 in 4,068 households. The following census in 2011 counted 28,083 people in 6,662 households. At the 2016 census, the district's population was 25,081 in 6,977 households. The district was separated from Larestan County on 25 March 2021 to become Juyom County.

Juyom Rural District is the richest part of the county in terms of water abundance. The largest seasonal lake of the province (with an area of 130 square kilometers) known as Pyramid Lake is located here. There are a total of 37 large and small springs in this section, the largest of which is called Sarcheshmeh, with a flow rate of 250 liters per second. Thirty-six aqueducts with a total length of 80 km irrigate agricultural fields and orchards. Over 200 agricultural wells and dozens of dolab wells have been identified in this sector. The 200-meter waterfalls of Rahmatabad, 20 kilometers north of Joyom, are the only waterfalls in this county.

Administrative divisions

The population history of Juyom County's administrative divisions (as Juyom District of Larestan County) over three consecutive censuses is shown in the following table.

References

Counties of Fars Province

fa:شهرستان جویم